The 1949 Penn State Nittany Lions football team represented the Pennsylvania State University in the 1949 college football season. The team was coached by Joe Bedenk.  He was named head coach after coaching the line for several years. After a single 5–4 season, Bedenk requested a return to coaching the line, and Penn State brought in Rip Engle as head coach The team played its home games in New Beaver Field in State College, Pennsylvania.

Schedule

References

Penn State
Penn State Nittany Lions football seasons
Penn State Nittany Lions football